Uilian Souza (born July 25, 1982) is a Brazilian footballer.

References

External links

1982 births
Living people
Association football midfielders
Brazilian expatriate footballers
Brazilian expatriate sportspeople in Indonesia
Brazilian expatriate sportspeople in Thailand
Brazilian footballers
Expatriate footballers in Indonesia
Expatriate footballers in Thailand
Uilian Souza
Indonesian Premier Division players
Persib Bandung players
Bangu Atlético Clube players
Uilian Souza
Footballers from Rio de Janeiro (city)